Eilif Straume (2 October 1928 – 18 August 2012) was a Norwegian writer and critic.

He held the cand.philol. degree. He worked as a high school teacher in Eidsvoll and at Stavanger Cathedral School, but is best known from his time in the Norwegian Broadcasting Corporation. He was also a consultant for Fjernsynsteatret and a literary and theatre critic in the newspaper Aftenposten. He issued a poetry collection in 1997, and has been a prolific reader in audiobooks.

He was a member of the Norwegian Academy for Language and Literature, and sat on the committee that awards the Riksmål Society Literature Prize. He has also been a board member of the Norwegian Critics' Association.

He resided in Oslo. He died in August 2012.

References

1928 births
2012 deaths
Writers from Oslo
Norwegian educators
NRK people
Norwegian literary critics
Norwegian theatre critics
Members of the Norwegian Academy